The 1948 Delta Bowl was a college football postseason bowl game between the Ole Miss Rebels and the TCU Horned Frogs. This was the first ever Delta Bowl.

Background
The Rebels won their first ever Southeastern Conference title under first year head coach Johnny Vaught, while playing in their first bowl game since 1936. The Horned Frogs finished 4th in the Southwest Conference, in their first bowl appearance since 1945.

Game summary
After a scoreless first quarter, TCU got onto the board off Ole Miss miscues. Lindy Berry returned an interception 28 yards for the touchdown, making it 7-0. Later in the quarter, an Ole Miss punt was blocked near the end zone, falling out of bounds for a safety. It was 9-0 TCU going into the fourth quarter, in a game with 7 combined turnovers. Ole Miss quarterback Charlie Conerly threw a pass to Joe Johnson, who ran 26 yards for the touchdown, making the score 9-6 after the extra point missed. On TCU's next possession, Bobby Wilson intercepted a pass, giving the Rebels the ball back. Conerly threw to Johnson, the pass falling complete for 52 yards to the TCU 13. Conerly threw a pass to Dixie Howell on the next play to put the Rebels on top 13-6 after the extra point went in. The Horned Frogs could still tie the game, but any hopes of a tie were vanquished when Red Buchanan intercepted a Horned Frog pass at the Rebel 38, sealing the game for the Rebels.

Aftermath
The Horned Frogs did not make another bowl game until 1952. As for the Rebels, they waited until 1953 for their next bowl appearance. Conerly was inducted into the College Football Hall of Fame in 1966.

Statistics

References

Delta Bowl
Ole Miss Rebels football bowl games
TCU Horned Frogs football bowl games
January 1948 sports events in the United States
Delta Bowl